Toíta may refer to:

Places
Toíta, Cayey, Puerto Rico, a barrio
Toíta, Cidra, Puerto Rico, a barrio